The Haliç Bridge (Golden Horn Bridge) is a road bridge across the Golden Horn in Istanbul, Turkey. It connects the neighbourhoods of Ayvansaray in the southwest and Halıcıoğlu in the northwest. The bridge carries the O-1 motorway, also known as the Istanbul Inner Beltway. It was constructed between 1971 and 1974, and entered service on 10 September 1974. The engineering work was carried out by IHI Corporation of Japan and Julius Berger-Bauboag AG of Germany.

See also
 Atatürk Bridge
 Galata Bridge
 Golden Horn Metro Bridge
 Golden Horn

External links

Bridges in Istanbul
Bridges completed in 1974
Golden Horn
Fatih
Beyoğlu
Road bridges in Turkey
IHI Corporation